Melngailis (feminine: Melngaile) is a Latvian surname. Individuals with the surname include:

 Emilis Melngailis (1874–1954), Latvian composer.
 Sarma Melngailis (born 1972), Latvian-American former businesswoman.
 Tenis Melngailis (1912–1980), Latvian chess player.

Latvian-language masculine surnames